Gagea chinensis is a Chinese species of plants in the lily family, found only in the Inner Mongolia (Nei Mongol) region of China.

References

chinensis
Flora of Inner Mongolia
Plants described in 2004